The 1881 United States Senate special election in New York was held from May 31 to July 22, 1881, by the New York State Legislature to elect two U.S. senators (Class 1 and Class 3) to represent the State of New York in the United States Senate.

Amid ongoing disputes with President James A. Garfield over federal patronage privileges in the state of New York, particularly the lucrative postings at the New York Customs House, Republican Senators Roscoe Conkling and Thomas C. Platt both resigned. Their resignations were designed to trigger special elections, in which they expected to be re-elected to affirm their support in the New York Legislature as a show of either popularity or political force. Instead, the legislature demurred for 52 days before electing Warner Miller and Elbridge Lapham in their place.

On July 1, Platt withdrew from the election after 31 inconclusive joint ballots, most of them led by Chauncey Depew. The early ballots for Conkling's seat were generally led by former Vice President of the United States William A. Wheeler. On July 2, President Garfield was shot by Charles Guiteau, who declared his support for Conkling's Stalwart faction immediately after the shooting. With no consensus emerging for either seat, a Republican caucus met on July 8 to nominate replacement candidates and settled on Warner Miller and Elbridge Lapham after Depew withdrew. Two weeks later, Warner Miller was elected to Platt's seat. Conkling's supporters held out for another week before acquiescing to the unanimous nomination of Lapham on July 22, ending the election.

President Garfield died on September 19. With the Stalwart faction effectively eliminated by Conkling's removal from office, Congress passed the Pendleton Civil Service Reform Act, which was signed into law by Chester A. Arthur, a former Conkling protégé.

Background
The Republican boss, and leader of the Stalwart faction, Roscoe Conkling had been elected to a third term (Class 3) in January 1879. Thomas C. Platt had been elected on Conkling's advice in January 1881 and had just taken his seat (Class 1) on March 4.

Conkling and Platt resignations

On May 16, 1881, both U.S. senators from New York resigned in protest against the distribution of federal patronage in New York by President James A. Garfield, a Half-Breed, without being consulted. The confrontation between the Stalwart and the Half-Breed (in the press now usually referred to as the "Administration men") factions of the Republican Party arose when the leader of the New Yorker Half-Breeds, President pro tempore of the State Senate William H. Robertson, was appointed Collector of the Port of New York, the highest paying federal office in New York. Conkling preferred that Collector Edwin Merritt continue on the post until his term would expire in 1882, and then give it to one of his Stalwart friends, but Garfield was set on showing his gratitude to Robertson who had been instrumental in Garfield's nomination at the 1880 Republican National Convention. On March 28, Conkling, Platt, Vice President Chester A. Arthur and Postmaster General Thomas L. James sent a letter to Garfield urging him to withdraw the nomination. Garfield resented this intrusion and did not budge. Conkling and Platt took exception to the fact that Robertson and the New York delegates to the National Convention had been pledged by the State Convention to vote for the nomination of former President Ulysses S. Grant, but had broken his pledge and orchestrated the nomination of another candidate.

Conkling and Platt then stood for re-election thus trying to rebuke the President and be vindicated by the State Legislature.

Legislative composition

At the 1879 state election, 25 Republicans and 7 Democrats were elected for a two-year term (1880–1881) in the State Senate.

At the 1880 state election, 81 Republicans and 47 Democrats were elected for the session of 1881 to the Assembly.

The 104th New York State Legislature met from January 4 to July 23, 1881, at Albany, New York.

Nominations

Republican caucus
When the first surprise about the resignations subsided, a majority of the Republican State legislators were determined to be rid of Conkling. Intense canvassing followed, many names were speculated about as candidates, but it proved difficult to call a caucus, since no majority of legislators or of the caucus committee agreed.

A caucus of Republican State legislators was finally called by Speaker of the Assembly George H. Sharpe for May 30. Assemblyman Andrew S. Draper presided, and secretaries were appointed. Only 8 State senators and 27 assemblymen were present, and the caucus adjourned for lack of quorum until the next day, but nobody was nominated.

Democratic caucus
The caucus of the Democratic State legislators met on May 30, Assemblyman Michael C. Murphy, of New York City, presided. They nominated Ex-U.S. Senator Francis Kernan and State Senator John C. Jacobs, both on the first ballot.

Elections
On May 31, the legally prescribed day for the election, the Assembly and the State Senate took a ballot, but no candidate received a majority. On June 1, both Houses met in joint session, compared the result of the ballot, and finding that nobody had received a majority in either House, proceeded to a joint ballot in which nobody received a majority either. Afterwards, Stalwarts and Administration men met in separate conferences. The Stalwarts hung on to Conkling and Platt. At the Administration men's conference 61 State legislators were present and Chauncey M. Depew was the frontrunner for the long term (Class 1), but the anti-Conkling men were split into a handful of factions, unable to compromise. From June 2 on, joint ballots were taken every day, Monday through Saturday at noon.

After almost three weeks of deadlock, it was believed that Governor Cornell would consider the votes cast for State Senator Jacobs as void, and to accept as elected any Republican candidate who would receive a simple majority of a quorum, meaning that if at least 81 votes were cast for all candidates except Jacobs, the frontrunner would be elected with 42. On this day, 155 legislators present, and 52 voting for Jacobs, somebody could claim to be elected with a vote of 52, and get his credentials issued by the governor. Thus, when Ex-Vice President Wheeler had received 50 votes in the 23rd ballot, State Senator Charles A. Fowler (Dem., 14th D.) withdrew Jacobs's name before the end of the roll call, and the Democratic members who had voted already (the roll was called in alphabetical order of surnames, first Senate, then Assembly) asked to change their votes, which was granted by Lt. Gov. George G. Hoskins.

After Jacobs's withdrawal during the 23rd ballot, a Democratic caucus was held in the afternoon of June 22, Assemblyman Michael C. Murphy presided. Ex-Congressman Clarkson N. Potter was nominated after an informal ballot, in which votes were scattered about 11 candidates, and a formal ballot in which Potter received a majority.

After a month of deadlock and 31 ballots, Thomas C. Platt withdrew from the contest on July 1, and most of the Platt men then switched to Richard Crowley. On the morning of the next day, President Garfield was shot and the news arrived in Albany just before the State Legislature met for the 33rd ballot.

On July 6, after the 37th ballot, the Anti-Conkling men met in conference. 59 legislators attended, and State Senator Dennis McCarthy presided. No agreement was reached, and a call was issued for a new conference to be held the next day. On July 7, after the 39th ballot, the Anti-Conkling conference was attended by 65 legislators, and a call for a regular Republican caucus was signed by 59 of them. On July 8, after the 41st ballot, a regular Republican caucus finally met. 64 legislators answered to the first roll call, and Thomas G. Alvord was chosen Chairman. Since the Stalwarts were not attending, it was agreed that nominations were to be made with a minimum vote of 54, a majority of the total 106 Republican legislators. The frontrunner to succeed Platt (Class 1 seat), Chauncey M. Depew, withdrew from the contest for the sake of party unity, and the caucus instead nominated Congressman Warner Miller on the fifth ballot (First ballot: Miller 27, William A. Wheeler 22, Sherman S. Rogers 9, Noah Davis 2, Alonzo B. Cornell 2, William M. Evarts 2, Richard Crowley 1, Roscoe Conkling 1, Henry E. Temain 1; Second ballot: Miller 28, Wheeler 28, Rogers 10; Third ballot: similar to second; Fourth ballot: Miller 32 then withdrawal of Rogers, then many changes, then withdrawal of Wheeler; Fifth ballot: Miller unanimously). Then they nominated on the second ballot Congressman Elbridge G. Lapham to succeed Conkling (First ballot: Lapham 38, Cornell 12, Tremain 10, Crowley 5, James W. Wadsworth 1; Second ballot: Most votes for Lapham, then some changes, then a re-call of the roll, and finally unanimously). The Conkling men however refused to accept the caucus nominations and continued to vote for Conkling, and now for Wheeler instead of Crowley to succeed Platt. On July 11, after the 43rd ballot, the Stalwarts demanded a new caucus but the Chairman of the State Senate Caucus Committee Dennis McCarthy refused to issue a call.

On July 16, after seven weeks of deadlock, Warner Miller was elected on the 48th ballot to succeed Platt. Conkling held out for another week. On July 22, after the 55th ballot, the Republican legislators met in conference. 76 legislators attended, State Senator Dennis McCarthy presided, and this conference issued the call for a caucus to meet at 3 p.m. The caucus was attended by Stalwarts and Administration men, all Republican legislators who had voted on the previous ballot being present. They nominated Elbridge G. Lapham on the first ballot (vote: Lapham 61, Conkling 28, Stewart L. Woodford 1, William M. Evarts 1), and the nomination was then "made unanimous." At 5 p.m. another ballot, the 56th and last, was taken by the State Legislature, and Lapham was elected to succeed Conkling.

Class 1 summary

Class 3 summary

Aftermath
Lapham and Miller took their seats on October 11, 1881, and served single terms. Lapham remained in office until March 3, 1885; Miller until March 3, 1887. Conkling's political career effectively ended after this episode, the second longest deadlock in New York State legislative history. Platt returned to the U.S. Senate in 1897, and served two terms until 1909.

Notes

Sources
 
 
 
 
 
 
 
 
 
 
 
 
 
 
 
 
 
 
 
 
 
 
 
 
 
 
 
 
 
 
 
 
 
 
 
 , [giving wrong numbers of ballots "36th" and "37th" in the summary, correct was 35th and 36th]
 
 
 
 
 
 
 
 
 
 
 
 
 
 
 
 
 
 
 

1881
New York 1881
New York
United States Senate
New York
July 1881 events
United States Senate 1881